The 1992–93 Ottawa Senators season was the inaugural season of the modern Ottawa Senators. Despite winning the first game of the regular season on October 8, 1992, the Senators won only nine more en route to their worst season ever. The team recorded three NHL records that season: the longest home losing streak of eleven, from October 27 to December 8; the longest road losing streak with a total of 39, from October 10 to April 3 (nearly the whole season) and fewest road wins in a season, with just one victory.

Off-season

Team business
On June 2, 1992, the then city of Kanata gave approval of the Palladium project. On June 29, the club held ground-breaking ceremonies for the Palladium project at the site. The team was still seeking partners for financing the project and Ogden Corporation would back $120 million in loans on November 11. Actual construction would begin in 1994.

On June 15, Rick Bowness was named as the team's first head coach. Bowness was previously a head coach for the original Winnipeg Jets and Boston Bruins.

On July 29, 1992, team president and former Ottawa mayor, Jim Durrell resigned.

Expansion and Entry drafts

Expansion Draft
The Senators participated in the 1992 NHL Expansion Draft on June 18, 1992, to fill their roster for the 1992–93 NHL Season.

Entry Draft
Ottawa's draft picks at the 1992 NHL Entry Draft in Montreal, Quebec.

Transactions

June 1992

Source

July 1992

Source

August 1992

Source

September 1992

Source

Pre-season
The Senators held their first training camp at the Robert Guertin Arena in Hull, Quebec, on September 8. The team played its first game in Hartford against the Hartford Whalers. The game ends in a 1–1 tie, and the Senators first goal is scored by Neil Brady. The first game in Ottawa since re-joining the NHL is played on September 18. The Washington Capitals defeat Ottawa 4–3. The first win by the Senators since re-entry into the NHL is recorded on September 24, a 4–3 win against the New York Islanders. Defenceman Brad Shaw scored the winning goal. On October 7, just before the start of the regular season, the Senators announce Laurie Boschman as the team's first captain.

Regular season

The Senators finished last in goals scored (202), wins (10), points (24, tied with the San Jose Sharks), even-strength goals scored (129), power-play goals for (66, tied with the Edmonton Oilers and the San Jose Sharks), power play goals against (115) and power play % (14.73) and shooting percentage (8.9%; 202 goals on 2,281 shots).

Two Senators recorded hat tricks during the regular season; Bob Kudelski scored one in a 3–2 victory over San Jose on Sunday, January 10, 1993 and Laurie Boschman scored one on Saturday, April 10, 1993, in a 5–3 win on the road against the New York Islanders.

Highlights

The new Senators played their first game on October 8, 1992, in the Ottawa Civic Centre defeating the eventual Stanley Cup champion Montreal Canadiens by a score of 5–3. The game was televised on Hockey Night In Canada and was in front of a sold-out Ottawa Civic Centre with 10,449 in attendance. The ceremonial face-off between Laurie Boschman and Denis Savard was done by Frank Finnigan, Jr. (his father having died on Christmas Day, 1991), Bruce Firestone and Gil Stein. There was much pre-game spectacle—the skating of Brian Orser, the nine banners being raised to honour the original Senators' Stanley Cup wins, retirement of Frank Finnigan's jersey number and the singing of the anthem by Alanis Morissette. The game was attended by Russell Williams, an Ottawa fan who had witnessed the last Stanley Cup win in Ottawa in the 1927 Stanley Cup Final, and would later attend the games of the 2007 Stanley Cup Final, held in Ottawa.

Starting lineup
Starting players:
 Peter Sidorkiewicz, goal
 Ken Hammond, defence
 Brad Shaw, defence
 Neil Brady, centre
 Jody Hull, right wing
 Sylvain Turgeon, left wing

Others:
Mark Lamb, Doug Smail, Darcy Loewen, Jamie Baker, Laurie Boschman, Andrew McBain, Norm Maciver, Chris Luongo, Tomas Jelinek, Marc Fortier, Mark Osiecki, Darren Rumble, Mike Peluso, Steve Weeks

Source: 

Neil Brady scored the first goal for the modern-day Ottawa Senators franchise in the game.

It would take the Sens 39 games to win a road game, in their third-to-last road game of the season. It would be the only road win for the Sens in the entire season, and the only points won on the road as well. After the season, General Manager Mel Bridgman was fired, and eventually, would be replaced by Randy Sexton.

Final standings

Schedule and results

Player statistics

Regular season
Scoring

Goaltending

Awards and records

Awards
 Molson Cup – Sylvain Turgeon
 NHL All-Star Game selection – Brad Marsh, Peter Sidorkiewicz

Milestones

Source:

Transactions

Trades

Free agents

Waivers

Source:

Farm teams
 New Haven Senators (American Hockey League)
 Thunder Bay Senators (Colonial Hockey League)

See also
 1992–93 NHL season

References
 
 
 

Ottawa Senators seasons
Ottawa Senators season, 1992-93
Ottawa